Gentofte Kommune is a municipality (Danish, kommune) in the Capital Region of Denmark (Region Hovedstaden) on the east coast of the island of Zealand (Sjælland) in eastern Denmark. January 2022). Since 17 May 2021, its mayor has been Michael Fenger, a member of the Conservative People's Party (Det Konservative Folkeparti).

Gentofte is the most wealthy municipality in Denmark and consists of several fashionable Copenhagen suburbs such as Hellerup and Charlottenlund.

The municipality is an amalgamation of three formerly independent towns, and several other local settlements, all close to one another. The site of its municipal council is in Charlottenlund. The three original towns were Gentofte, Vangede and Ordrup. It later included Tuborg, Skovshoved, Dyssegård, Hellerup, Jægersborg, and Klampenborg.

Neighboring municipalities are Lyngby-Taarbæk to the north, Gladsaxe to the west, and Copenhagen to the south. The Øresund, the strait that separates Zealand from Sweden, is to the east.

Gentofte municipality was not merged with other municipalities in the 1 January 2007 nationwide Kommunalreformen.

Lars Ulrich was born in Gentofte.

Demography

Politics

Municipal council
Gentofte's municipal council consists of 19 members, elected every four years.

Below are the municipal councils elected since the Municipal Reform of 2007.

Attractions 
 Bellavista housing estate and Bellevue Teatret designed by Arne Jacobsen
 Bernstorff Palace
 Charlottenlund palace, park and forest
 Ordrupgaard – art museum, French impressionists, Paul Gauguin, Danish paintings from around 1900, varying special exhibitions.
 Gentofte Sportspark – football stadium, home stadium of Hellerup IK
 Kildeskovshallen- swimming pool (including a 50m pool, 25m pool, a children's pool, a baby pool with warm water basin, and also Finnish saunas), including also other facilities such as two halls for ball game, a physiotherapist clinique, fitness centre, conference rooms, and a restaurant.  
 Øregård Museum

Education
Gentofte Municipality is home to four public upper secondary schools: Øregård and Gammel Hellerup in Hellerup, Aurehøj in Gentofte and Ordrup Gymnasium in Ordrup. Gentofte Municipality is also home to the private Rygaards International School and Copenhagen International School, although the latter are going to relocate to new premises that are under construction in the Nordhavn district of Copenhagen. Gentofte Studenterkursus offers a two-year programme.

Notable people 
 Lars Ulrich - Drummer of Metallica
 King Haakon VII - Prince of Denmark/King of  Norway

Parks and open spaces

The most important parks are Charlottenlund Beach Park, Hellerup Beach Park, Bernstorff Park.

Natural habitats are found at Gentofte Sø, a huge lake with many birds on it, Ermelunden in Jægersborg and Gammelmose in Vangede, Øregård Park (or Øregård Museum's Garden) with a beautiful lake, benches and also a playground. A small section of Jægersborg Dyrehave also extends into the municipality, while the rest, including the Dyrehavsbakken fun fair, is in Lyngby-Taarbæk.

Twin towns – sister cities

Gentofte is twinned with:
 Halmstad, Sweden
 Hanko, Finland
 Sermersooq, Greenland
 Stord, Norway

See also 
 Gentofte station
 Gentofte Hospital
 Steno Diabetes Center
 Kildeskovshallen
 Gentofte Town Hall
 Gentofte#Notable people

References

 Municipal statistics: NetBorger Kommunefakta, delivered from KMD aka Kommunedata (Municipal Data)
 Municipal mergers and neighbors: Eniro new municipalities map
 Demography: Statistical Yearbook of Copenhagen.

External links

Official website
Local Portal
Dit-Gentofte - Local media in Gentofte

 
Municipalities in the Capital Region of Denmark
Municipalities of Denmark
Copenhagen metropolitan area